Aviation in Lycoming County, Pennsylvania has dated back well over a 100 years. The first flight occurred in 1910 in Campian Hills (modern Loyalsock Township).

History
Aviation in Lycoming County dates back to approximately 1909. Where brothers Fred and Harry Burns worked to build the county's first working and functional aircraft. And seven years after the Wright Brothers of Kitty Hawk, North Carolina successfully took flight did the dream of aviation fully set in. With the inspiration of the Wright Brothers Fred and Harry teamed up with neighborhood friend August Kuntz. And on September 19, 1910 residents of Crampian Hills (now Loyalsock Township) heard what seemed to be a railroad locomotive, and looking to the sky saw "Great White wings" according to the Sunday Grit (now Williamsport Sun-Gazette). The Burns brothers and Kuntz had built the first ever aircraft in Lycoming county. After several more flights and spectacles the aircraft was sold to the Federal Army of Mexico for scouting purposes.

However the three aviators were not alone, famed aviator Lincoln J. Beachey came to Williamsport, Pennsylvania on his many travels across the United States. Local residents gathered to see Beachey's flying machine on July 8, 1911 where it took off from the Kenmore Land Co. field which is where East Third Street and Northway Road are today.

Despite the actions of the Burn brothers, August Kuntz and Beachey the region was not struck by the aviation boom until local pilots Captain Cleo Francis Pineau and A.W. Hinaman paved the way. Pineau served with the Royal Air Force during World War I. After which he returned to Williamsport where he helped form the airport. Hinaman was an instrumental in local aviation, eventually heading up Hinaman Aircraft Corp., which sponsored the first commercial flight to New York City. Hinaman also started the regions first flight school which trained pilots during World War II.

Formation of an airport 

It wasn't until 1929 that Lycoming County had an official airport. About two years prior the city had bought 161 acres from local farmers for about $75,000. Where they constructed a hangar, and a x style cross runway for about $30,000. The airport was dedicated on July 20, 1929 and was heralded as one of the great leaders of the aviation movement on the east coast. An estimated crowd of 30,000 were in attendance which, until the 2011 Little League World Series, was the largest gathering in Lycoming county history.

The Airport held its first flight earlier that year and was operational ever since. The first ever commercial flight from New York City to Williamsport occurred in 1931.

This world record stood for almost 20 years, and was only recently broken in Argentina, but is still a national record.

The Williamsport Regional Association of Pilots holds a Fly-In every June. From 1996 to 2013 Williamsport Regional Airport held an Air Show and Ballonfest at the airport. Drawing large numbers from the area. Some of the most well known aircraft to arrive to the airport are the following: B-17, 193d Special Operations Wing's EJ-130J and the EC-130 Commando Solo

On May 14 the airport held an open house and airshow on the grounds. Some of the aircraft that were at the show were the "Spirit of Freedom" Douglas C-54 Skymaster used in the Berlin Blockade (or Berlin Airlift). Also an Ex-FedEx Express Boeing 727 now an aircraft classroom for Pennsylvania College of Technology, and a Boeing B-17 Flying Fortress, Douglas SBD Dauntless and many more.

Modern aviation 

Aviation is still prominent in the Williamsport area. With one airline still flying into Williamsport (American Airlines) on a daily basis.

Notable occurrences
 September 19, 1910 – First ever flight in Lycoming County 
 July 8, 1911 – Stunt pilot Lincoln J. Beachey visits what is now Loyalsock Township
 1927 – City of Williamsport and local Chamber of Commerce buy 161 acres of land for $75,000 from three farmers for future site of airport
 July 20, 1929 – Williamsport Regional Airport is dedicated with more than 30,000 people in attendance 
 July 21, 1929 – Amelia Earhart visits airport 
 1931 – First commercial flight to/from New York City lands in Williamsport 
 December 1, 1959 – Allegheny Airlines Flight 371 a Martin 2-0-2 crashed into a mountain on approach about 1.3 miles outside of South Williamsport, Pennsylvania killing all but one of the 26 passengers and crew on board making it the deadliest air disaster in Pennsylvania history, until USAir Flight 427.
 August 10, 1971 – Airport holds first air show
 June 11, 2012 – City council approves $13 million expansion project at airport

Gallery
Images of aviation in Lycoming County:

See also 
 Aviation in Pennsylvania

References

Lycoming County, Pennsylvania